The Mesa Falls Tuff is a tuff formation created by the Mesa Falls eruption that formed the Henry's Fork Caldera that is located in Idaho west of Yellowstone National Park. This eruption, 1.3 million years BP, was preceded by the Huckleberry Ridge Tuff and succeeded by the Lava Creek Tuff, both of which were also created by the Yellowstone hotspot.

See also
Yellowstone Caldera
Snake River Plain
Island Park, Idaho
Upper Mesa Falls
Lower Mesa Falls

References

Yellowstone hotspot
Volcanism of Idaho
Volcanism of Wyoming
Geologic formations of Wyoming
Geologic formations of Idaho
Landforms of Yellowstone National Park
Quaternary Idaho
Quaternary Wyoming
Tuff formations
VEI-7 eruptions
Volcanic eruptions in the United States
Plinian eruptions
Pleistocene volcanism